The 2019–20 Columbia Lions men's basketball team represented Columbia University in the 2019–20 NCAA Division I men's basketball season. The Lions, led by fourth-year head coach Jim Engles, played their home games at Levien Gymnasium in New York City as members of the Ivy League. They finished the season 6–24, 1–13 in Ivy League play to finish in last place. They failed to qualify for the Ivy League tournament, although the tournament was ultimately cancelled due to the COVID-19 pandemic.

Previous season
The Lions finished the 2018–19 season 10–18 overall, 5–9 in Ivy League play, to finish in seventh place. In turn, they failed to qualify for the Ivy League tournament.

In May 2019, assistant Kenny Blakeney was hired as the new head coach at Howard.

Roster

Schedule and results

|-
!colspan=12 style=| Non-conference regular season

|-
!colspan=9 style=| Ivy League regular season

|-

Source

See also
 2019–20 Columbia Lions women's basketball team

References

Columbia Lions men's basketball seasons
Columbia Lions
Columbia Lions men's basketball
Columbia Lions men's basketball